Joi Chua (born 3 August 1978) is a Singaporean female pop singer. Her most famous songs are "Waiting for a Sunny Day" (《等一个晴天》), "Watching the Sunrise With Me" (《陪我看日出》), the Chinese version of "Nada Soso" and "Wind Chimes" (《风铃》). She is also well known in Mainland China and Taiwan.

Early life 
Chua was educated at Raffles Girls' Primary School, Clementi Town Secondary School, and Singapore Polytechnic majoring in optometry. Her original major was business administration, but she shifted her major into optometry 3 months later. She was influenced by her elder brother to pick up singing from a young age. She joined and led the choir in her Secondary school and later joined budding singers in The Ark, a café with live performances, which molded the most important part of Chua's singing career. Her mother died when she was 19. Both her mother and one of her aunts died from breast cancer.

"蔡" ("Chua" or "Tsai", pinyin: Cài) is her family name. "淳" (pinyin: Chún) is equal to "醇" (its pinyin is also: Chún) in ancient Chinese, both meaning "mellow", "good-natured" or "good-hearted". Now the latter character "醇" is only used to describe the good quality of wine. "佳" ("Joi", pinyin: jiā) means "well" or "fine".

Career

Entertainment (1996 – present) 
Chua debuted as a commercial singer in 1996 in "Extraordinary Singers Course" organized by Ocean Butterflies Production Company, where she was chosen from over 2,000 candidates at its premiere audition to join the label as a trainee singer. Her first album under the same name, was however only launched in 2000 as she decided to complete her education before embarking on her singing career. Unfortunately, the album did not receive its desired response, and Chua returned to the hospital to work as an optometrist between 2001 and 2003 after her short stint.

Chua released her second album Sunrise (《日出》) with Play Music in 2003. This album helped her pick up the merit award under the cultural achievement category for The Outstanding Young Person Award for 2006. Play Music was later acquired by Warner Music and Chua came under the wings of the global music label till 2010 before switching to her own management.

Chua was later commissioned by Mediacorp to sing many Channel 8 NKF Drama Series theme songs and the sub-theme songs like There is Hope for Life (《梦在手里》), and she also performed at the Singapore National Day Parade in 2005 and 2008. She also led the music Craze Concert in 2005, 2006 and was the anchor performer for Chingay Parade 2012. Chua started her own music label "Joi Music" and produced her latest EP, Perspectives in 2012.

In China, Chua sang at the CCTV big annual show Mid-Autumn Festival Gala Evening (《中秋晚会》) in 2007 2008 and 2014. She acted in Royston Tan's new film "3688" (《想入飞飞》) in June 2015.

Business venture 
Trained as an optometrist, in 2011 Chua started her own optical practice "Eyecare People" in Holland Village, Singapore.

Social causes 
Chua was appointed the ambassador for the Singapore Speak Mandarin Campaign 2005 which involved her in concerts over 12 different primary and secondary schools to promote the campaign. She sang the Chinese theme song of Uniquely You (《非常特别的你》) with the Singapore Tourism Board in promoting Singapore as a choice destination to both locals and foreigners. Chua also contributes as an ambassador for World Visions and Mercy Relief.

Personal life 
Chua is married in December 2009 to her beau of 10 years.

Awards 
Chua was later nominated Best Female Vocalist in the industry's most prestigious "Taiwan's Golden Melody Awards" in 2008 for her album, Joi Blessed (《庆幸拥有蔡淳佳》). She went on to win "Best Asia-Pacific Vocalist" in the "Original Chinese Music Awards" held in China in 2010 with her album Back to Basics (《回到最初》). Her co-written work Darkness (《不透光》) from this EP, with prolific composer-producer Jim Lim won her, her first "Best Melody Composition" award in Singapore e-Award in 2012.

Star Awards

Discography 

Other cover songs include:
 《细水长流》 (with 蔡礼莲 & 唐玉璇, original sung by Liang Wern Fook (梁文福) & 刘瑞政 & 王邦吉)
 《相亲相爱》 (original sung by various artists from Warner Music)

Filmography

References

External links 
 Official homepage.
 Joi Chua's Music on iTunes.

1978 births
Living people
Singaporean people of Hokkien descent
21st-century Singaporean women singers
Singaporean Mandopop singers
Singaporean singer-songwriters